Scott Lee Peterson (born October 24, 1972) is an American convicted murderer. In 2004, he was convicted of the 2002 first-degree murder of his wife, Laci, who was pregnant at the time, and the second-degree murder of their unborn son, Conner, in Modesto, California.

Following his conviction, Peterson was sentenced to death by lethal injection. His case was put on automatic appeal to the Supreme Court of California. On August 24, 2020, the death penalty for Peterson was overturned, though his conviction was upheld. He was re-sentenced to life in prison without the possibility of parole on December 8, 2021.

Early life and marriage
Scott Lee Peterson was born October 24, 1972, at Sharp Coronado Hospital in San Diego, California, to Lee Arthur Peterson, a businessman who owned a crate-packaging company, and Jacqueline "Jackie" Helen Latham, who owned a boutique in La Jolla called The Put On. Though Lee and Jackie had six children from previous relationships, Scott was their only child together. As a child, Peterson shared a bedroom with his half-brother John in the family's two-bedroom apartment in La Jolla. He began playing golf at an early age, a result of time he spent with his father. By age 14, he could beat his father at the game. For a time, Peterson had dreams of becoming a professional golfer like Phil Mickelson, his teammate at the University of San Diego High School. By the end of high school, he was one of the top junior golfers in San Diego.

In 1990, Peterson enrolled at Arizona State University (where Mickelson had also enrolled) on a partial golf scholarship. Mickelson would go on to become a highly successful PGA golfer, and Peterson's father, Lee, later testified that the considerable competition that Mickelson presented while they were at Arizona State discouraged Peterson. Randall Mell of the Broward County, Florida, Sun-Sentinel reported that Chip Couch, the father of another young golfer, Chris Couch, who was visiting Arizona State on a recruiting trip, told Mell that he got Peterson kicked off the golf team. Couch stated that Peterson had taken Chris out drinking and to meet girls, resulting in a hangover for Chris. Because Chris was the No. 1 junior in the country, Chip did not want Peterson to threaten his son's future, and he complained to the golf coach, who kicked Peterson off the team. Peterson transferred to Cuesta College, in San Luis Obispo, and later to California Polytechnic State University. He initially planned to major in international business, but changed his major to agricultural business. Professors who taught Peterson described him as a model student. His agribusiness professor Jim Ahern commented, "I wouldn't mind having a class full of Scott Petersons."

While at California Polytechnic, Peterson worked at a restaurant in Morro Bay called the Pacific Café. One of his co-workers would receive visits from a neighbor named Laci Denise Rocha, who also attended Cal Poly as an ornamental horticulture major. When Peterson and his future wife first met at the restaurant in mid-1994, Laci made the first move, sending him her phone number. Immediately after meeting Peterson, Laci told her mother that she had met the man that she would marry. Peterson later called Laci and they began dating, their first date being a deep-sea fishing trip on which Laci got seasick. As the relationship grew more serious, Peterson put aside his dreams of professional golf in order to focus on a business career. The couple dated for two years and eventually moved in together. In 1997, after Laci graduated, they married at Sycamore Mineral Springs Resort, in San Luis Obispo County's Avila Valley. While Peterson finished his senior year, Laci took a job in nearby Prunedale. Prosecutors have stated that around this time, Peterson engaged in the first of at least two extramarital affairs, though they did not reveal names or details of these relationships. Peterson graduated with a Bachelor of Science degree in agricultural business in June 1998.

After their graduations, the Petersons opened a sports bar in San Luis Obispo called The Shack. Contrary to a Los Angeles Times story that reported that Peterson's parents loaned him money to open the establishment, his parents emphatically told the San Francisco Chronicle that they did not, believing that it was a bad investment. When the couple had difficulty finding a technician to install a needed vent in the restaurant, Peterson took the necessary certification course in Los Angeles in order to install it himself. Business was initially slow, but eventually improved, especially on weekends. The Petersons decided to put The Shack up for sale when they moved to Laci's hometown of Modesto to start a family. In October 2000, they purchased a three-bedroom, two-bath bungalow house for $177,000 on Covena Avenue in an upscale neighborhood near East La Loma Park. They sold the Shack in April 2001.

Laci soon took a part-time job as a substitute teacher, and Peterson got a job with Tradecorp U.S.A., a newly founded subsidiary of a European fertilizer company. According to Peterson's father, the company was trying to establish a customer base in the U.S., and they hired Peterson as their West Coast representative. Working on salary plus commission, he sold irrigation systems, fertilizer, chemical nutrients, and related products to big farms and flower growers, primarily in California, Arizona, and New Mexico. Peterson was earning a salary of $5,000 a month before taxes. 

Laci's loved ones, including her mother and younger sister, stated that she worked enthusiastically at being the perfect housewife, enjoying cooking and entertaining, and that she and her family welcomed the news in 2002 that she was pregnant. In November 2002, when Laci was seven months pregnant, Peterson was introduced by a friend to a Fresno massage therapist named Amber Frey. In later public statements, Frey said Peterson told her he was single, and the two began a romantic relationship. The last time Peterson's parents saw Laci was during a three-day weekend they spent together in Carmel, California, the week before Christmas.

Disappearance of Laci Peterson

On December 23, 2002, at 5:45 pm, Peterson and Laci went to Salon—the workplace of Laci's sister Amy Rocha—for a monthly scheduled haircut. As they spoke, Rocha said Peterson offered to pick up a fruit basket that she had ordered for her grandfather as a Christmas gift the next day because he would be playing golf at a course nearby. Prosecutors say Peterson also told other people he would be playing golf on the day of Christmas Eve. Later that evening, Sharon Rocha, Laci's mother, spoke with Laci on the telephone around 8:30 pm.

Peterson later told police that he last saw his wife about 9:30a.m. on December 24, 2002, when he left to go fishing at the Berkeley Marina. He said that she was mopping the floor, and was planning to walk the family dog, McKenzie, at a nearby park, and bake gingerbread cookies. Peterson had also said that she had been watching a Martha Stewart cooking show that morning. Later that morning Karen Servas, a neighbor of the Petersons, stated that around 10:30am she found the Petersons' dog, a golden retriever named McKenzie, alone outside the home and returned him to the Petersons' backyard. Another neighbor named Mike Chiavetta said he saw McKenzie at about 10:45am as he played catch with his own dog. The Modesto Bee also reported an unnamed female neighbor who found the dog with muddy leash, wandering in the neighborhood, and who returned the dog to the Petersons' yard, not observing that anything was out of place. Peterson said he returned home that afternoon to find it empty. Peterson said Laci's 1996 Land Rover Discovery SE was in the driveway. Peterson also stated that he found McKenzie in their back yard, and that he related this to Laci's mother, Sharon, though she later denied this in her book. He showered and washed his clothes because he got wet during his fishing trip "from the bay and being rained on", as police detective Allen Brocchini later testified. He then ate some pizza with milk.

According to ABC News, Peterson called his mother-in-law, Sharon Rocha, to ask if Laci was with her, which was the first time Sharon learned that Laci was missing. Later that evening Ron Grantski called the police to report Laci missing. Laci was seven-and-a-half months pregnant with a due date of February 10, 2003. The couple had planned to name the baby boy Conner. Laci was reported missing on Christmas Eve, and the story attracted nationwide media interest.

Modesto police detectives Allen Brocchini and Jon Buehler, the lead investigators on the case, responded to the call. When they arrived at the Peterson home, Laci's keys, wallet and sunglasses were found in her purse in a closet.

When the detectives questioned Peterson that evening, Buehler told ABC News in 2017, "I suspected Scott when I first met him. Didn't mean he did it, but I was a little bit thrown off by his calm, cool demeanor and his lack of questioning...he wasn't, 'Will you call me back? Can I have one of your cards? What are you guys doing now?'" Buehler further described Scott's behavior as "a strange combination of polite and arrogant, disaffectedly distant and impatiently irritable. He just didn't seem like a man who was crushed or even greatly disturbed by his wife's disappearance and possible death."

Although Peterson initially said he had spent the day golfing, he later told the police that he had gone to fish for sturgeon at the Berkeley Marina. At 2:15 p.m., he left a message for Laci, stating, "Hey, Beautiful. It's 2:15. I'm leaving Berkeley." Peterson stated that he went fishing about 90 miles from the couple's Modesto home. Detectives immediately launched a search. Sharon Rocha immediately hurried to the park to search for her daughter. She stated that when she saw Scott about 20–30 feet away she repeatedly called him by name, but he did not acknowledge her, and was distant when she approached him back at his house, angling away from her when she attempted to hug him.

Although inconsistencies in Peterson's statements led police to suspect foul play almost immediately, they did not treat the case as suspicious within the first few hours after the missing persons report was filed. During this initial period, Peterson's in-laws defended him and portrayed him and Laci as the ideal couple, and public perception of Peterson reflected this. As police continued to investigate, they grew more suspicious of Peterson.

On January 17, 2003, it became known that Peterson had engaged in two other extramarital affairs prior to an affair with a woman named Amber Frey. Frey informed police of their relationship on December 30, 2002, shortly after discovering he was a person of interest in Peterson's disappearance, She told detectives that she met Peterson on November 20, and that he had initially told her he was single. She also informed police that Scott had told her on December 9, two weeks before Peterson's disappearance, he was a widower, and it would be the first Christmas without his wife. Police considered whether this was an indication that Peterson had already decided to kill Laci, which Sharon Rocha agreed was a possibility.

She agreed to phone him while police recorded her subsequent phone conversations with Peterson in the hopes of getting him to confess. During the trial, the audio recordings of the couple's telephone conversations were played, and the transcripts were publicized. The recordings revealed that in the days after Laci went missing, Peterson told Frey that he had traveled to Paris to celebrate the holidays, in part with his new companions Pasqual and François. In reality, he had made one of these phone calls minutes before attending the New Year's Eve candlelight vigil for Laci in Modesto.

At a January 24, 2003, press conference, the Rocha family publicly withdrew their support of Peterson, explaining that they did this upon learning of his affair with Frey, in particular upon seeing photos of Peterson and Frey together. A month after Laci's disappearance, her brother, Brent Rocha, stated at a press conference that although Peterson had admitted to him during a January 16, 2003, phone conversation that he had been having an affair with a woman from Fresno at the time, Peterson was now no longer communicating with the Rocha family.

Recovery of Laci and Conner's remains
On April 13, 2003, a couple walking their dog found the decomposing body of a small baby, in a marshy area of the San Francisco Bay shore in Richmond's Point Isabel Regional Shoreline park, north of Berkeley. Although a judge sealed autopsy results, an anonymous Associated Press source revealed that 1.5 loops of nylon tape were found around the fetus's neck and a significant cut was on the fetus's body.

One day later, a passerby found the torso of a recently pregnant woman, wearing beige pants and a maternity bra, on the eastern shore of the bay, along a rocky shoreline of the same park, one mile away from where the baby's body was found. The corpse was decomposed to the point of being almost unrecognizable as a human body since the head, arms, most of the legs and all the internal organs except for the uterus were missing.

On April 18, 2003, the results of DNA tests verified that the bodies were Laci Peterson and her son, who was to be named Conner. The autopsy on both bodies was performed by forensic pathologist Dr. Brian Peterson (no relation). Conner's skin was not decomposed at all, though the right side of his body was mutilated. An April 24 ABC News report stated his umbilical cord was still attached, and the San Francisco Chronicle reported that it appeared torn, rather than cut or clamped, as is the normal practice following birth. However, ABC News later reported on May 30 that according to the autopsy, the placenta and umbilical cord were not found with the body.

The exact date and cause of Laci's death were never determined. Her cervix was intact. She had suffered two cracked ribs, but Dr. Peterson could not determine if this occurred before or after her death. Laci's upper torso had been emptied of internal organs except for the uterus, which protected the fetus, explaining the lower level of decomposition it experienced. Dr. Peterson concluded that the fetus had died in utero, and determined he had been expelled from Laci's decaying body, though when cross-examined in court the following year, he conceded that he could not determine whether he had been born alive when this occurred. Dr. Peterson also found meconium in the fetus's bowels, which is the first stool passed after birth.

The discovery of the bodies created a greater sense of urgency for Brocchini and Buehler, who had put a tracker on Peterson's car. Knowing that he was in San Diego at the time, they feared he would escape across the border to Mexico. Brocchini commented in 2017, "I just thought, 'We've got to find Scott right now. He told me he was there and that's where the bodies come up? I mean, I believe it was premeditated, he planned it ... San Diego was pretty darn close to the Mexican border. Scott knew the area pretty well. That's where his parents lived. That's where he lived. So it wasn't like he was going to have to get on MapQuest to try and figure out a way to get to Tijuana."

The FBI and Modesto Police Department performed forensic searches of Peterson's home. The FBI also conducted mitochondrial DNA testing on a hair from pliers found in Peterson's fishing boat that linked them with hairs recovered from Laci's hairbrush. The authorities also searched Peterson's pickup truck, toolbox, warehouse, and boat. They found a homemade anchor in the boat Peterson purchased two weeks earlier. Peterson told a detective that he made the anchor in his boat, using a 90-pound bag of concrete, and used the rest to repair his driveway. However, petrographer Robert O’Neill said that microscopic analysis of solid fragments and powder found in Peterson's warehouse, pickup bed, boat, boat cover, and a plastic pitcher matched the material in the single anchor, as well as a pea-sized pebble police found in his living room, but none matched a sample from the driveway. Detective Henry Dodge Hendee testified that he found a cement-like substance on the wooden bed of a boat trailer when he searched Peterson's warehouse on December 27. Hendee pointed to what he said were five circular areas on the trailer that had less powder than other areas on the trailer. He also found a dustpan surrounded by the white powder and a sledgehammer. Prosecutors believed that Peterson made five anchors, and used four of them to sink Laci's body in San Francisco Bay. After Peterson was arrested, police conducted further searches in the bay in an attempt to locate the anchors, but nothing was found.

Arrest
Peterson was arrested on April 18, 2003, near a La Jolla golf course. He told police that he was meeting his father and brother for a game of golf. His naturally dark brown hair had been dyed blonde, and he had grown a mustache and goatee. His Mercedes-Benz was "overstuffed" with miscellaneous items, including nearly $15,000 in cash, twelve Viagra tablets, survival gear, camping equipment, several changes of clothes, four cell phones, and his brother's driver's license, in addition to his own. Peterson's father explained that he used his brother's license the day before to get a San Diego resident discount at the golf course and that Peterson had been living out of his car because of the media attention. However, police suspected these items were an indication that Peterson planned to flee to Mexico, an idea prosecutors would later concur with.

On April 21, 2003, Peterson was arraigned before Judge Nancy Ashley in Stanislaus County Superior Court. He was charged with two felony counts of murder with premeditation and special circumstances: the first-degree murder of Laci and the second-degree murder of Conner. He pleaded not guilty, and was held without bail.

Trial
Before his arraignment, Peterson had been represented by Kirk McAllister, a veteran criminal defense attorney from Modesto. Chief Deputy Public Defender Kent Faulkner was also assigned to the case. Peterson later indicated that he could afford a private attorney, namely Mark Geragos, who had done other high-profile criminal defense work. On January 20, 2004, a judge changed the venue of the trial from Modesto to Redwood City, because Peterson was the victim of increasing hostility in the Modesto area.

Peterson's trial began on June 1, 2004, and was followed closely by the news media. The lead prosecutor was Rick Distaso while Geragos led Peterson's defense. In opening statements, Geragos claimed Peterson was "a cad" for cheating on Laci but was not a murderer.

Prosecution witness Frey hired her own attorney, Gloria Allred, to represent her. Allred was not bound by the gag order imposed on those involved in the trial. Although she maintained that her client had no opinion about whether Peterson was guilty, Allred was openly sympathetic to the prosecution. She appeared frequently on television news programs during the trial.

Prosecutors claimed Peterson made cement anchors to weigh his wife's body down in San Francisco Bay. Scott's defense attorney, Mark Geragos, pointed out that no such anchors were found after a search of the floor of San Francisco Bay with sonar equipment accurate enough to locate objects as small as a tin can. However, Geoffrey Baehr, who helped lead over 15 diving expeditions off the Berkeley Marina to search for Laci, testified that thick mud, strong currents, dark waters, and a strong surge can make it "virtually impossible" for such equipment to locate an object, even when the target is known, and that this is why they did not find Laci's body or any anchors. To emphasize this point, Baehr related that when his crew accidentally dropped the underwater sonar device into the water, it took four diving trips to locate it, even though the crew knew precisely where it had landed. 

Peterson's defense lawyers based their case on the lack of direct evidence and played down the significance of circumstantial evidence. They also questioned whether the investigation was thorough, since Modesto police Detective Mike Hermos admitted he did not check the alibi of a prostitute who was accused of stealing checks from Peterson's mailbox, but Hermos did not indicate that the woman was ever a suspect and prosecutor Dave Harris noted that the checks were stolen after Laci vanished, precluding the woman from involvement in her disappearance. A police community service officer testified that an interview with Peterson had no sound because no batteries had been placed in the tape recorder that was used to record it. Other detectives were called to testify about the extensive search for evidence.

The defense suggested the fetal remains were of a full-term infant and theorized that someone kidnapped Laci, held her until she gave birth and then dumped both bodies in the bay. The prosecution's medical experts contended that the baby was not full-term and died at the same time as his mother.

Juror Fran Gorman was removed and replaced during deliberations due to misconduct, after she conducted independent research on the case. Jury foreman and attorney Gregory Jackson then requested his own removal, most likely because his fellow jurors wanted to replace him as foreman. Geragos told reporters that Jackson had mentioned threats he received when he requested to be removed from the jury. Jackson was replaced by an alternate.

Evidence
Among the considerable circumstantial evidence that prosecutors presented was the fact that Peterson changed his appearance and purchased a vehicle using his mother's name in order to avoid recognition by the press. He added two pornographic television channels to his cable service only days after his wife's disappearance. The prosecution stated this meant he knew she would not be returning home. Peterson expressed interest in selling the house he had shared with Laci, and traded in her Land Rover for a Dodge pick-up truck.

The only forensic evidence that was offered as a direct connection between Peterson and the homicide was from a single hair, matched through DNA comparison to hair from Laci's hairbrush, that was stuck to pliers found on Peterson's boat.

Rick Cheng, a hydrologist with the United States Geological Survey and an expert witness on tides of the San Francisco Bay, testified as a witness for the prosecution. During cross-examination, Cheng admitted that his findings were "probable, not precise." Tidal systems are sufficiently chaotic, and he was unable to develop an exact model of the bodies' disposal and travel. As the trial progressed, the prosecution opened discussion of Peterson's affair with Frey and the contents of their secretly recorded telephone calls.

Charles March, a fertility specialist, was expected to be a crucial witness for the defense, one who, according to the San Francisco Chronicle, could single-handedly exonerate Peterson by showing that Laci's fetus died a week after prosecutors claimed. Under cross-examination, March admitted basing his findings on an anecdote from one of Laci's friends that she had taken a home pregnancy test on June 9, 2002. When prosecutors pointed out that no medical records relied on the June 9 date, March became flustered and confused on the stand and asked a prosecutor to cut him "some slack", undermining his credibility. Summing up this key defense witness, Stan Goldman, a criminal law professor at Loyola Law School in Los Angeles said, "There were moments today that reminded me of Chernobyl." According to one newspaper account about March's testimony, "By the end of his testimony Thursday, legal analysts and jurors closed their notebooks, rolled their eyes and snickered when they thought no one was looking".

Motive
The prosecution presented Peterson's affair with Frey, financial problems, and impending fatherhood as motives for the murder, surmising that he killed Laci due to increasing debt and a desire to be single again.

Verdict and sentencing

On November 12, 2004, the jury convicted Peterson of two counts of murder: first-degree murder with special circumstances for killing Laci, and second-degree murder for killing the fetus she carried. The penalty phase of the trial began on November 30, and concluded December 13, when the jury rendered a sentence of death. On March 16, Judge Alfred A. Delucchi followed the jury verdict, sentencing Peterson to death by lethal injection and ordering him to pay $10,000 toward the cost of Laci's funeral, calling the murder of Laci "cruel, uncaring, heartless, and callous".

In later press appearances, members of the jury stated that they believed Peterson's demeanor—specifically his lack of emotion and the phone calls to Frey in the days following Laci's disappearance—indicated his guilt. Juror No. 1, Greg Beratlis, and two other jurors, said they based their verdict on "hundreds of small 'puzzle pieces' of circumstantial evidence that came out during the trial, from the location of Laci Peterson's body to the myriad lies her husband told after her disappearance.

On October 21, 2005, a judge ruled that proceeds from a $250,000 life insurance policy Peterson took out on Laci would go to Laci's mother, which was reaffirmed by the Fifth District Court of Appeal on October 21, 2005. Peterson's automatic appeal was filed in the Supreme Court of California on July 5, 2012.

Peterson arrived at San Quentin State Prison in the early morning hours of Wednesday, March 17, 2005. He was reported not to have slept the night before, being too "jazzed" to sleep. He joined the more than 700 other inmates in California's sole death row facility during the appeals process.

In September 2006, former congressman William E. Dannemeyer sent a letter to the California Attorney General and other officials arguing that Laci Peterson had been killed by members of a Satanic cult, not by Peterson.

Appeal and death sentence overturn
On July 6, 2012, Peterson's attorney, Cliff Gardner, filed a 423-page appeal of Peterson's sentence, stated that the publicity surrounding the trial, incorrect evidentiary rulings, and other mistakes deprived Peterson of a fair trial. The State Attorney General's office filed their response brief on January 26, 2015. The defense filed a response to the State's brief in July 2015, claiming that a certified dog that detected Laci's scent at Berkeley Marina had failed two-thirds of tests with similar conditions.

In November 2015, the defense filed a habeas corpus petition, claiming that a juror lied on her jury application, and that there was evidence that neighbors saw Laci alive after Scott left home. On August 10, 2017, the State Attorney General responded to the appeal by filing a 150-page document contesting the notion disputing the claims put forward in the appeal, stating that the appeal ignored "overwhelming evidence" that Peterson murdered Laci. Supervising Deputy Attorney General Donna Provenzano stated that the timeline of the crime was established by the neighbor who found the Petersons' Golden Retriever, McKenzie, wandering in the street with its leash still attached, before the sightings of Laci and her dog. Provenzano also indicated, "Purported sightings of Laci were legion," noting 74 reported sightings in 26 states and overseas, most of which she stated, were neither viable nor corroborated.

In August 2018, the defense filed a reply, the sixth brief filed. The brief included six claims of "deficient performance" by trial attorney Mark Geragos, such as failing to call experts in fetal growth, dog scent, how bodies move in water, stating that he would call witnesses but failing to follow through on this, and failing to properly address burglary evidence.

In March 2019, California Governor Gavin Newsom issued a moratorium for all 737 prisoners on death row in California, including Peterson. The order postponed all executions for the duration of Newsom's tenure as governor. California had not executed a prisoner since 2006 due to legal challenges to the state's execution protocol. Newsom's order spares the approximately 25 prisoners on death row who had exhausted their legal appeals and could have had their executions move forward once the legal challenge was resolved. Peterson's sister-in-law Janey Peterson welcomed Newsom's decision but noted that his case was likely to be unaffected by it, and did not believe Peterson would exhaust all of his legal challenges by January 2027, when Newsom would be leaving office, assuming his re-election in 2022.

On June 2, 2020, the California Supreme Court heard argument on Scott Peterson's appeal. The defense argued that prospective jurors were improperly excused; that the trial judge improperly allowed two jurors onto Peterson's boat; that the judge erred in insisting the prosecution be present during defense testing of the boat; and that the motion to move the trial to another county should have been granted due to juror questionnaire results showing almost half of the prospective jurors had already concluded Peterson was guilty prior to the trial. The prosecution countered that the California Supreme Court should overturn the verdict only if it were to find that a prospective juror was improperly dismissed, and that "there was 'no credible claim' that any of the 12 jurors who decided Peterson's fate were unfair or partial."

On August 24, 2020, in a 7–0 decision, the Supreme Court of California upheld Peterson's conviction, but overturned his death sentence, because Peterson's trial judge, Alfred Delucchi, who had died on February 26, 2008, had dismissed jurors who opposed capital punishment without asking them whether they could put their views aside. Justice Leondra Kruger explained that per Supreme Court rulings since 1968, "Jurors may not be excused merely for opposition to the death penalty, but only for views rendering them unable to fairly consider imposing that penalty in accordance with their oath. This is the meaning of the guarantee of an impartial jury." Prosecutors initially stated that they would retry the penalty phase, but subsequently reversed that decision in June 2021.

On September 22, 2021, California Superior Court Judge Anne-Christine Massullo ruled that Peterson would be re-sentenced to life in prison without the possibility of parole. The following month, Massullo scheduled a hearing on that matter for December 8. On December 8, Massullo re-sentenced Peterson to life in prison without the possibility of parole, for the first-degree murder of Laci, and a concurrent sentence of 15 years to life for the second-degree murder of Conner.

In October 2022, Peterson was moved off San Quentin's death row, and transferred to Mule Creek State Prison in Ione, California.

On December 20, 2022, Massullo rejected Peterson's request for a new trial, which Peterson requested on the basis that Juror No. 7, Richelle Nice, committed misconduct when she lied about her own history of domestic abuse during jury selection, which Peterson stated had tainted the jury. Massullo concluded that there was no evidence to support this accusation, explaining that Nice did not intentionally conceal this information with the motive to stay on the jury, nor appeared vengeful toward Peterson in letters she later wrote him in the prison. Massullo wrote, "The Court concludes that Juror No. 7’s responses were not motivated by pre-existing or improper bias against [Peterson], but instead were the result of a combination of good faith misunderstanding of the questions and sloppiness in answering." Peterson still had the legal option of appealing her ruling.

Media

Documentary media about the case
 In 2004, E! aired an episode of The E! True Hollywood Story on the case.
 In 2007, Court TV covered the case with a documentary titled Scott Peterson: A Deadly Game.
 In 2010, the Peterson case was the topic of the eponymous premiere episode of Investigation Discovery's True Crime with Aphrodite Jones.
 In 2015, the series Murder Made Me Famous covered the story in its second episode, which premiered August 22. It re-aired in 2017 on the American cable channel Reelz as Scott Peterson: What Happened?
 In April 2017, Crime Junkie Podcast produced two episodes detailing Peterson's murder.
 On April 21, 2017, the NBC news magazine Dateline aired the two-hour special, The Laci Peterson Story: A Dateline Investigation.
In May 2017, the Peterson case was the main focus of "Notorious: Scott Peterson", the Season 20 premiere of the Oxygen TV series Snapped.
 In June 2017, ABC aired a two-hour documentary on the case titled Truth and Lies: The Murder of Laci Peterson.
 In July 2017, HLN aired a two-hour program on the case titled How It Really Happened.
 In August 2017, the case was covered in A&E's six part series, The Murder of Laci Peterson.
 In November 2017, Investigation Discovery aired a two-hour documentary titled Scott Peterson: An American Murder Mystery.
 In December 2018, the case was discussed on the talk show Dr. Phil.
 In May 2021, the case was covered in the 48 Hours episode "Scott Peterson: Case in Question".
 In May 2021, the case was covered in the 20/20 episode "One Last Chance".

Portrayals of Scott Peterson
 In 2004, Peterson was played by Dean Cain in The Perfect Husband: The Laci Peterson Story.
 In 2005, Peterson was portrayed by Nathan Anderson in the TV movie, Amber Frey: Witness for the Prosecution.
 Although the case had been compared to the plot of Gillian Flynn's 2012 novel Gone Girl, Flynn refuted the notion her book was inspired by the Petersons, saying that although she saw parallels between the two, she made a point not to rely on any specific true account for her fiction. Rather, her portrayal of her characters as out-of-work writers was derived from her own experience being laid off from her job as a writer for Entertainment Weekly.
 Peterson was mentioned in Episode 71 of the crime drama Cold Case, "The War at Home". In the episode, Philadelphia Police Detective Will Jefferies wonders if a man named Geoff Taylor murdered his wife, Dana, commenting that he may have "pulled a Scott Peterson."

Further reading

Notes

References

External links

Kim, Eun Kyung (August 15, 2017). "Scott Peterson breaks silence on wife's murder in death row phone call". Today.
"Inside Scott Peterson's Shockingly Comfortable Life on Death Row (EXCLUSIVE)". In Touch Weekly. June 1, 2016.

1972 births
Living people
2002 murders in the United States
21st-century American criminals
American male criminals
American murderers of children
American people convicted of murder
American prisoners sentenced to death
American prisoners sentenced to life imprisonment
California Polytechnic State University alumni
Crime in California
Criminals from California
Male murderers
People convicted of murder by California
People from San Diego
Prisoners sentenced to death by California
Prisoners sentenced to life imprisonment by California
Violence against women in the United States